George Theodore Felbeck (February 1, 1897 – March 1, 1962) was an American businessman who was born in Salina, Kansas, United States to Lewis and Matilda Felbeck.  He married Helen Mildred née Kniseley on November 5, 1919.

Felbeck was a graduate of the University of Illinois where he received his B.S.M.E. degree in 1919 and his M.S.M.E. degree in 1921.  He left college in 1918 to serve in the infantry of the U.S. Army.  While at Illinois he was a member of Sigma Pi fraternity.  He received his Ph.D. in physical chemistry from the California Institute of Technology in 1943.

Felbeck became a research assistant for Union Carbide in 1923, then headed its plant in Buffalo, New York. He then moved to New York City in 1925 to serve as an engineer for Union Carbide. He served at Oak Ridge, Tennessee, from 1942 to 1946 in the Manhattan Project as a chemical and nuclear engineer, under the command of Kenneth Nichols. In 1944 he was appointed president of Union Carbide and served until he retired on February 28, 1962.

He and Helen had five children, Dr. George T. Felbeck, Jr., Dr. David K. Felbeck, Richard B. Felbeck, Kristina A. Felbeck (died 1936) and Karen H. Canaday.

Felbeck and his wife were two of 95 passengers who died in the American Airlines Flight 1 crash on March 1, 1962, the day after his retirement.

References

1897 births
1962 deaths
Accidental deaths in New York (state)
American chemical engineers
United States Army personnel of World War I
Manhattan Project people
People from Salina, Kansas
20th-century American engineers
Victims of aviation accidents or incidents in 1962
Victims of aviation accidents or incidents in the United States
University of Illinois alumni